Erechthias molynta is a moth of the family Tineidae. It was first described from the Seychelles, but is also found on the Chagos Archipelago.

External links

Erechthiinae
Fauna of Seychelles
Moths described in 1911